Guilty Bystander is a 1950 American crime drama directed by Joseph Lerner, and starring Zachary Scott and Faye Emerson. The film was shot on location entirely in New York City.  It also marked the last motion picture screen appearances for character actors Mary Boland and J. Edward Bromberg. Until recently, Guilty Bystander was considered a lost film.

Plot
Max Thursday is an ex-cop and an alcoholic. The only job he can find is house detective at his pal Smitty's rundown hotel.

Ex-wife Georgia comes to him in a panic. Their young son Jeff is missing and so is her brother Fred Mace. She didn't report it, after being warned not to go to the police by Dr. Elder, who is a business acquaintance of Fred's.

The drunken Max confronts pistol packing Dr. Elder, looking for answers regarding his missing son, but the doctor knocks him out cold from behind. Max wakes up and is taken to police headquarters for questioning.  He soon learns that Dr. Elder has been killed and he becomes the prime suspect. Georgia gives the cops a false alibi for Max, so the police have no cause to hold him, and he's released.

Now sober, Max learns that the doctor was involved in a diamond smuggling operation with Varkas, a known criminal. He learns from Varkas' helpful moll, Angel, that the gangster's men are holding Fred hostage.

Max is shot in the arm by Varkas' thugs.  He goes to Georgia who stitches his wounds. When he recovers, he goes to Varkas' warehouse to look for Mace. He discovers that Varkas and his bodyguards are all dead.

Max finally realizes that his old friend Smitty is behind the whole scheme. Fred and little Jeff are rescued. Grateful Georgia embraces her little boy and welcomes Max back into the family.

Cast
 Zachary Scott as Max Thursday
 Faye Emerson as Georgia
 Mary Boland as Smitty
 Sam Levene as Captain Tonetti
 J. Edward Bromberg as Varkas
 Kay Medford as Angel
 Jed Prouty as Dr. Elder
 Harry Landers as Bert
 Dennis Patrick as Fred Mace
 Ray Julian as Johnny

Reaction

Film critic Bosley Crowther, writing for The New York Times, calls Guilty Bystander's plot as average but notes "... the slow, sultry, steaming sadism that is usually standard in this type of film is rather effectively accomplished. The photography is full of heavy moods. And some of the melodramatic action, such as a chase in the subway, is good."

Film critic Dennis Schwartz panned the film in his review, but praised Zachary Scott's acting chops.  He wrote, "Zachary Scott acts his butt off, but can't come close to saving this uninteresting film noir melodrama from how ordinary it is. It's a low-budget film that is saddled with a weak storyline and is poorly photographed. It's about a world of assorted losers: drunks, hypochondriacs, smugglers, and double-crossers ... There's just not much of a story here to sink your teeth into. The film's best asset is Scott acting out the part of a thirsty drunk."

References

External links
 
 
 
 
 

1950 films
1950 crime drama films
American crime drama films
American black-and-white films
Film noir
Films scored by Dimitri Tiomkin
Films based on American novels
1950s English-language films
1950s American films